The Door with Seven Locks is a 1962 German-language crime film directed by Alfred Vohrer and starring Heinz Drache. It is an adaptation of the 1926 Edgar Wallace novel of the same name.

Cast
 Heinz Drache as Inspector Richard "Dick" Martin
 Sabine Sesselmann as Sybil Lansdown (as Sabina Sesselmann)
 Eddi Arent as Kriminalassistent Holms
 Pinkas Braun as Dr. Antonio Staletti
 Hans Nielsen as Mr. Haveloc
 Gisela Uhlen as Emely Cody, née Cawler
 Werner Peters as Bertram Cody
 Jan Hendriks as Tom Cawler
 Ady Berber as Peter Cawler / Giacco
 Siegfried Schürenberg as Sir John
 Friedrich Joloff as caretaker Burt
 Klaus Kinski as Pheeny
  as announcer at airport (voice) (uncredited)
 Arthur Schilsky as Peter Livingston (uncredited)
 Alfred Vohrer as announcer at airport / onlooker (uncredited)

Production
It is an adaptation of the Edgar Wallace novel The Door with Seven Locks which had previously been made into a 1940 British film of the same title. Cinematography took place between 26 February and 30 March 1962 at the Ufa-Filmatelier, Berlin and at locations like Tempelhof and Pfaueninsel.

Release
The FSK gave the film a rating of 16 and up and found it not appropriate for screenings on public holidays.

It premiered in France under the title La porte aux sept serrures on 2 June 1962 at the Scarlett/Paris. The German premiere was on 19 June at the Europa-Palast at Frankfurt.

References

External links

1962 films
1960s mystery films
1960s crime thriller films
German mystery films
German crime thriller films
West German films
1960s German-language films
German black-and-white films
Films directed by Alfred Vohrer
Films based on British novels
Films based on works by Edgar Wallace
Films produced by Horst Wendlandt
Films set in London
Mad scientist films
Remakes of British films
1960s German films